Koonungidae is a family of crustaceans belonging to the order Anaspidacea.

Genera:
 Koonunga Sayce, 1907
 Micraspides Nicholls, 1931

References

Crustaceans